Twice Upon a Time is a 1983 American animated adventure fantasy comedy film co-directed by John Korty and Charles Swenson from a screenplay by Korty, Swenson, Suella Kennedy and Bill Couturié. The first animated film produced by George Lucas, it uses a form of cutout animation which the filmmakers called "Lumage", involving prefabricated cut-out plastic pieces that the animators moved on a light table.

The film features improvised dialogue and a visual blend of live-action, traditional 2D-animation and stop motion.

Plot
In the eternally busy city of Din, the black-and-white Rushers constantly go about their business in a fast-paced way and stop only to sleep, due to their Cosmic Clock being wound too tightly. Din lies between two worlds that create dreams to deliver to the sleeping Rushers – one is the bright and cheerful Frivoli, where Greensleeves and his Figmen of Imagination bring sweet dreams; and the other is the Murkworks, a dark and dingy factory home to vultures who drop nightmare bombs. The evil  Botch, maniacal ruler of the Murkworks, wants to foil Greenie's efforts and subject the Rushers to non-stop waking nightmares. He uses his vultures to kidnap the Figs and Greensleeves, but not before Greensleeves writes an S.O.S. to Frivoli.

Meanwhile, two misfits – known as Ralph, the All-Purpose Animal (named so for his somewhat unreliable shapeshifting abilities), and Mumford, a Chaplinesque mime – are put on trial for their incompetence at work. They are determined to prove themselves when they meet Flora Fauna, Greensleeves's niece, who found her uncle's S.O.S. and wants to rescue him. Botch spies on the three through Ibor, his robot gorilla, and uses Ralph and Mum's desire to be heroes to his advantage. Botch deceives the three, claiming to be a friend of Greenie and telling them that Greensleeves can be saved if they go into Din and take the main spring from the Cosmic Clock. Flora stays behind to act the part of the damsel in distress for Botch's nightmares.

Mumford and Ralph release the spring which causes time to freeze. They chase the spring throughout Din, but Botch's vultures steal the spring and begin planting every nightmare bomb in the Murkworks' inventory all over Din. A Fairy Godmother (FGM) twinkles in to tell Mumford and Ralph that they have been tricked and gives them three dimes to make a phone booth appear in case they need her help. FGM also recruits the help of the dim-witted but musclebound Rod Rescueman to aid them. Rod is more interested in rescuing Fauna, however, and abandons the boys to find her.

Ralph and Mumford find nightmare bombs scattered in an office, ready to be set off by Botch once starts time again. Mumford accidentally detonates a bomb and the two are trapped in a nightmare in which they are nearly killed by office supplies. When they are finally freed from the nightmare, the Fairy Godmother transports them back to Frivoli, suggests that they give up after all the mistakes they've made, and fires them from the hero business. This further strengthens Ralph and Mumford's resolve to do right. Meanwhile, Rod "rescues" Flora from the Murkworks and attempts to get a kiss from her. She tries to escape from his floating apartment in the sky and falls, landing on a mechanical serpent that attempts to stop Ralph and Mumford from reaching the Murkworks. The trio and Rod storm their way in with the help of Scuzzbopper, Botch's former nightmare screenwriter, who decides to aid them after Botch cruelly discards his recently completed "Great Amurkian Novel."

Rod and Flora rescue Greenie and the Figs but have to contend with Ibor. Rod tries to save Flora again but fails, and Flora destroys the robot herself. At the same time, Botch has his head vulture Rudy fly the spring back to Din as the final phase of his plan. When Ralph, Mumford, and Scuzzbopper enter Botch's office, he has his pet rat attack them but Scuzzbopper tricks it into chasing a bowling ball out a window. Botch retreats to a control room housing his master nightmare bomb button, "The Big Red One", with Ralph and Mumford chasing after him. Ralph finally manages to control his shapeshifting to get through Botch's arsenal of booby traps and flies into the control room, while Mumford struggles through the traps and into the barrel of Botch's cannon. Ralph, in the form of a fly, tricks Botch into pressing The Big Red One, detonating all of the nightmare bombs before Rudy could put the spring back in the Cosmic Clock, the still-immobilized Rushers being unaffected. An enraged Botch is about to kill Ralph for ruining his plans when one last nightmare bomb appears, about to blow. Terrified of being subjected to his own nightmare, Botch is knocked out the window. The bomb turns out to be Mumford, who had stretched his hat over himself and used a cigar to simulate nightmare smoke. Ralph and Mumford consider themselves heroes, while Botch is saved and carried away by his vultures (who may harbor ill-will toward Botch for his insults and cruel demands).

Scuzzbopper, Flora, and Rod assume command of the Murkworks, with Flora giving a parting kiss to Ralph and Mumford for helping to save Greenie. As the two heroes leave, the Fairy Godmother congratulates them and allows them to keep their last dime as a symbol of good luck. The spring returns to the Cosmic Clock of its own will, and restarts the flow of time, but at a pace where the Rushers can enjoy their lives.

Cast
 Lorenzo Music as Ralph, the All-Purpose Animal
 Julie Payne as Flora Fauna
 Marshall Efron as  Botch
 Hamilton Camp as Greensleeves
  James Cranna as Rod Rescueman / Scuzzbopper / Frivoli Foreman
 Paul Frees as Narrator / Chef of State / Judges / Bailiff
 Judith Kahan Kampmann as The Fairy Godmother ("F.G.M.")

Release
The studio producing Twice Upon a Time, The Ladd Company, was nearing bankruptcy and had a choice of either putting the movie into limited release or worldwide release, facing a similar difficulty with The Right Stuff. The Ladd Company decided to release Twice Upon a Time into a limited release and there were few early screenings of the film. Both this film and The Right Stuff failed at the box office, causing The Ladd Company to shut down years later.

Alternate versions
There were many different versions of this movie because the producers could only hire improvisational comedians.

In one version, Greensleeves is not kidnapped at the beginning.  Ralph and Mumford release and lose the spring, then stop by a bar where they meet Greensleeves, who urges the boys to get the spring.  Later, the spring escapes the vultures and finds its way to Greenie, who is then asked to put the spring back in the cosmic clock.  At this point, the vultures swoop in and capture Greensleeves and the spring.

Another version of the movie included Synonamess Botch swearing throughout the film. From the outset, director John Korty did not want to use the dialogue of the original script, but actor Marshall Efron thought his lines were perfect and played up the raunchier aspects of his character. Some lines were selected by producer Bill Couturié as he felt it would help the film appeal to older audiences. Korty was unaware of this until opening night and was angry about how Marshall Efron's lines were delivered from the script. Most theaters that showed the film also played the version with the profanity instead of reprinting it with the family friendly cut. Although the censored version was not rated, the version with the profanity was given a PG rating.

TV and home video
A few years later, Twice Upon a Time was shown by HBO. However, the version that HBO received and showed was the version with the profanity. When Korty found out, he immediately contacted HBO, threatening legal action if this version was aired again. After three showings, HBO suspended broadcasts of the film until supplied with a new family-friendly cut from Korty.  This new cut filled-out the remaining showings of Twice Upon a Time scheduled that month, prompting complaints of "censored" movies being shown on HBO.  Following these complaints, HBO chose to never air the film again on their service. Two months later, Showtime and over-the-air pay television service Spectrum acquired rights to show the film, but only the Korty-approved version. This version had the complete scene of "Out on My Own" as well as the uncut final reel of the film absent from the later home video version.

In 1991, the film was released on videocassette and laserdisc. This release contains John Korty's intended family-friendly cut, with some scenes roughly trimmed short to remove profanity that was still present.  Years later, Amazon made the film temporarily available for rental download via Amazon Unbox. Now the film is unavailable there, citing licensing restrictions.

Its cult status boosted when the film began to be shared on viral video sites. Perhaps in response to the lack of official support for the film, several bootleg copies of the original, uncut version were available via torrents. The film aired on the Disney Channel as part of its "Magical World of Disney" movie block in 1997, it also aired as part of Cartoon Network's Cartoon Theatre on September 12, 1998. It has also been shown early mornings on Turner Classic Movies, first on February 1, 2015 as part of the channel's TCM Underground block, and again on May 20, 2019. 

The film was released in a Special Edition DVD on September 29, 2015 through Warner Archive. The DVD contained both cuts, an audio commentary with John Korty and selected crew members (including Henry Selick), and the original theatrical trailer & tv spots.

Soundtrack
The soundtrack features several songs performed by Maureen McDonald written by Tom Ferguson, Maureen McDonald, and her brother Michael. Also included is one song performed by Bruce Hornsby and written by Hornsby and his brother John, as well as one track performed by Lawrence Welk and His Orchestra.

References

External links
 
 
 
 
 Twice Upon a Time: The Movie Time Forgot (Part 1) – Interview with writer and animation historian Taylor Jessen.
 Twice Upon a Time: The Movie Time Forgot (Part 2) – Interview with art director Harley Jessup.

1983 films
1983 animated films
1980s children's animated films
1980s children's fantasy films
1980s fantasy comedy films
American animated fantasy films
American fantasy adventure films
American children's animated fantasy films
American children's animated comedy films
American films with live action and animation
American fantasy comedy films
Cutout animation films
Lucasfilm films
Lucasfilm animated films
1980s stop-motion animated films
Films directed by John Korty
1980s American animated films
The Ladd Company films
Warner Bros. films
Warner Bros. animated films
1980s fantasy adventure films
1983 comedy films
1980s English-language films